Eudonia spectacularis is a moth in the family Crambidae. It was described by Edward Meyrick in 1929. It is found on the Marquesas Archipelago in French Polynesia.

References

Moths described in 1929
Eudonia